Chris Walker (born December 25, 1969) is an American college basketball coach and former player. He served as interim head coach of the Texas Tech Red Raiders during the 2012–13 season following the forced resignation of Billy Gillispie.  After Tubby Smith was named Gillispie's permanent successor in 2013, Walker returned to his previous post as associate head coach.
Walker is now an analyst at CBSSN, a position he took in 2019 after having served as an assistant coach at California under Wyking Jones.

Head coaching record

Notes

External links
Texas Tech bio
 

1969 births
Living people
African-American basketball coaches
African-American basketball players
California Golden Bears men's basketball coaches
College men's basketball head coaches in the United States
Loyola Marymount Lions men's basketball coaches
New Mexico Lobos men's basketball coaches
Pepperdine Waves men's basketball coaches
Point guards
Texas Tech Red Raiders basketball coaches
UMass Minutemen basketball coaches
Vanderbilt Commodores men's basketball coaches
Villanova Wildcats men's basketball coaches
Villanova Wildcats men's basketball players
American men's basketball players